Sawyer House (or Sawyer Homestead) may refer to the following locations on the National Register of Historic Places:

Second C. A. Sawyer House, in Newton, Massachusetts
Freeman-Brewer-Sawyer House, in Hillsboro, Illinois
Louis Sawyer House, in Wyoming, Ohio
Sawyer Farmhouse in Goshen, New York
Sawyer Homestead (Sterling, Massachusetts)
Sawyer House (Boxford, Massachusetts)
Sawyer House (Monroe, Michigan)
Sawyer-Wayside House, on the National Register of Historic Places listings in Lake County, Ohio
Strickland-Sawyer House, on the National Register of Historic Places listings in Ellis County, Texas
Sturdivant-Sawyer House, in Centerville, Iowa
Watson-Sawyer House in Hamburg, Arkansas

See also
 Sayer House (disambiguation)